Jake Morris (born 13 May 1999) is an Irish hurler who plays for Tipperary Senior Championship club Nenagh Éire Óg and at inter-county level with the Tipperary senior hurling team. He usually lines out as a right wing-forward.

Playing career

Nenagh CBS

Morris first came to prominence as a hurler with Nenagh CBS. He played in all grades before joining the school's senior team and made several appearances in the Dr. Harty Cup.

University of Limerick

After lining out for the University of Limerick freshers' team in his first year, Morris made his first appearance in the Fitzgibbon Cup on 20 January 2019. He scored three points in a 0-26 to 0-20 defeat by University College Cork.

Nenagh Éire Óg

Morris joined the Nenagh Éire Óg club at a young age and played in all grades at juvenile and underage levels, enjoying divisional success in some competitions.

On 21 October 2018, he lined out at centre-forward when Nenagh Éire Óg faced Clonoulty-Rossmore in the final of the Tipperary Senior Championship. He top scored for the club with six points, including five frees, in the 2-13 to 0-23 defeat.

Tipperary

Minor, under-21 and under-20

Morris was just 16-years-old when he made his first appearance for the Tipperary minor team on 23 April 2016. He scored a point from midfield in the 1-20 to 1-17 defeat by Waterford in the Munster Championship. On 10 July, he top scored with 1-04 when Tipperary defeated Limerick by 1-24 to 0-10 to win the Munster Championship final. On 4 September, Morris was at centre-forward when Tipperary faced Limerick in the All-Ireland final. He was Tipperary's top scorer once again in the 1-21 to 0-17 victory.

Morris was eligible for the minor grade again the following year, however, his tenure in the grade ended on 3 July 2017 following a 2-22 to 2-19 defeat by Cork.

Morris made his first appearance for the Tipperary under-21 team on 21 June 2018. He was named at full-forward but played much of the game in the half-forward line in a 1-22 to 1-13 defeat of Limerick in the Munster Championship. On 4 July he scored a point from left wing-forward in Tipperary's 2-23 to 1-13 defeat by Cork in the Munster Championship final. On 26 August, both Tipperary and Cork faced each other again in the All-Ireland final. Morris ended the game as top scorer with 1-04 in a 3-13 to 1-16 victory for Tipperary. He ended the year by being named in the right corner-forward position on the Team of the Year.

On 9 July 2019, Morris made his first appearance for Tipperary's inaugural under-20 team. He top scored with 0-13 from right corner-forward in the 3-23 to 0-10 defeat of Waterford. On 23 July 2019, Morris scored 1-03, including the winning goal, when Tipperary defeated Cork by 3-15 to 2-17 to win the Munster Championship.

Senior

Morris made his first appearance for the Tipperary senior team on 27 May 2018. He was introduced as a 70th-minute substitute and scored a point to secure a 2-20 to 1-23 draw with Cork in the Munster Championship.

On 30 June 2019, Morris was selected at left corner-forward when Tipperary faced Limerick in the Munster final. He scored a point from play but ended on the losing side following the 2-26 to 2-14 defeat.

Career statistics

Club

Inter-county

Minor

Under-21/under-20

Senior

Honours

Tipperary
All-Ireland Senior Hurling Championship (1): 2019
All-Ireland Under-21 Hurling Championship (2): 2018, 2019
Munster Under-20 Hurling Championship (1): 2019
All-Ireland Minor Hurling Championship (1): 2016
Munster Minor Hurling Championship (1):2016

References

External links
Jake Morris profile at the Tipperary GAA website

1999 births
Living people
Nenagh Éire Óg hurlers
Tipperary inter-county hurlers